Streams of Thought, Vol. 2 (also known as Streams of Thought, Vol. 2: Traxploitation) is the second extended play by American emcee Black Thought. It was released on November 26, 2018, by independent distributors Human Re Sources and Passyunk Productions. Produced entirely by Salaam Remi, the EP is the sequel to Streams of Thought, Vol. 1, released five months earlier.

Critical reception

Streams of Thought, Vol. 2 was met with positive reviews. Writing for HipHopDX in December 2018, Riley Wallace praised Remi's production, calling it "reminiscent of classic Motown sessions", and concluded, "Though Salaam does little to push Black Thought outside of his comfort zone, it does little to distract from how solid this project is, and the lyrical depth and complexity of all nine tracks." In his Substack-published "Consumer Guide" column, Robert Christgau applauded the rapper for showing "how conscious a romantic lead's conscience can be" and wrote in summary that, "no longer hemmed in by album concepts or fusion-band masquerade, here’s where Tariq Trotter is freed to turn out kick-ass rap mixtapes and show off how much reading he does." Fellow critic Tom Hull, who had deemed the first volume as "half of a pretty good Roots album", said Vol. 2 is the "second half of that Roots album even stronger, with no reason to miss the live band".

Track listing
All tracks written by Tariq Trotter and Salaam Remi; all tracks produced by Salaam Remi.

Notes
Reek Ruffin is Black Thought's alias as a singer.

Charts

References

2018 EPs
Black Thought EPs
Albums produced by Salaam Remi